is a Japanese professional footballer who plays as a full-back for Azul Claro Numazu on loan from Tokyo Verdy.

References

External links

1996 births
Living people
Japanese footballers
Association football defenders
People from Kunitachi, Tokyo
Association football people from Tokyo Metropolis
Tokyo Verdy players
Azul Claro Numazu players
J2 League players
J3 League players